The Eastern Zone was one of the three regional zones of the 1982 Davis Cup.

10 teams entered the Eastern Zone in total, with the winner promoted to the following year's World Group. Indonesia defeated Japan in the final and qualified for the 1983 World Group.

Participating nations

Draw

First round

Hong Kong vs. Philippines

Quarterfinals

Malaysia vs. Indonesia

Philippines vs. South Korea

Chinese Taipei vs. Japan

Sri Lanka vs. Thailand

Semifinals

Indonesia vs. South Korea

Japan vs. Thailand

Final

Indonesia vs. Japan

References

External links
Davis Cup official website

Davis Cup Asia/Oceania Zone
Eastern Zone